Taha’a (sometimes spelled as "Tahaa") is an island located among the western group, the Leeward Islands, of the Society Islands in French Polynesia, an overseas territory of France in the Pacific Ocean. The islands of Taha’a and neighboring Raiatea to the immediate south are enclosed by the same coral reef, and they may once have been a single island. At the 2017 census it had a population of 5,234. It is also known as the "Vanilla Island" and produces pearls of exceptional quality.

Etymology 
Taha’a is spelled in Tahitian using the apostrophe (in fact a variant of it, the okina, hard to differentiate from the regular apostrophe when using small fonts) to represent the glottal stop, as promoted by the Académie Tahitienne and accepted by the territorial government. This apostrophe, however, is often omitted. In old travelogues, the transcription Oataha is sometimes used.

History
Tahaa was formerly called Uporu, after the island of Upolu in Samoa. Due to its proximity to Raiatea, it has been strongly dependent. But during the 18th and 19th centuries it was a strategic place in the conflict of rivalries between Raiatea and Bora Bora.

According to Polynesian legend, Tahaa and Raiatea were separated by the wagging tail of an eel, possessed by the spirit of a princess.

At the time of Captain Cook's visits in 1769 and 1773, the island was under the occupation of Bora Bora warriors.

In 1863 a Chilean ship that was in search of slaves was shipwrecked near the town of Tiva in the southwest of the island, some of the crew members stayed and adopted local wives, which gave rise to their descendants being called the "Spanish clan".

The island became a protectorate and then a French colony, and is now part of French Polynesia.

Geography 
There are numerous smaller islands in the reef surrounding Taha'a, particularly to the north. At least one of these islands, Moie, is privately owned.

Climate 
Taha'a has a humid tropical maritime climate. In general, there are two main seasons:

The hot season, from November to April (the austral summer).

The cold season, from May to October (the austral winter).

Flora and fauna 
Tahaa is covered with lush vegetation, mostly coconut trees.

Its waters are teeming with crabs, barracudas, gray sharks, Napoleon wrasses, dolphins, oysters and corals.

Demographics 
The main village is Patio and the population was 4,869 inhabitants in the 2002 census.

The evolution of the number of inhabitants is known through the population censuses carried out in the municipality since 1971. As of 2006, INSEE publishes annually the legal populations of municipalities, but the law on local democracy of February 27, 2002, in its articles on the population census, introduced population censuses every five years in New Caledonia, French Polynesia, Mayotte and the Wallis and Futuna Islands, which was not the case before.

For the municipality, the first comprehensive census under the new system was conducted in 2002, previous censuses having been conducted in 1996, 1988, 1983, 1983, 1977 and 1971.

In 2017, the municipality had 5,234 inhabitants, an increase of 0.27% over 2012.

Administration
Administratively, Taha’a and the surrounding islets emerging from the coral reef form a commune (municipality) part of the administrative subdivision of the Leeward Islands. Tahaa consists of the following associated communes:
 Faaaha
 Haamene
 Hipu
 Iripau
 Niua
 Ruutia
 Tapuamu
 Vaitoare

The administrative centre of the commune of Tahaa is the settlement of Patio.

Economy
Like most Polynesian islands, Tahaa bases its economy essentially on fishing and tourism: on the motu (the thin strips of land rising from the coral reef) that surround it, especially in the north, there are numerous hotels and tourist villages, generally made up of fares or bungalows connected by wooden walkways.

Tahaa is world famous for its vanilla production, which accounts for about 80% of all Polynesian production. The island specifically cultivates the Vanilla tahitensis variety, obtained by crossing the pods of Vanilla planifolia with those of Vanilla pompona. The aroma of vanilla is so unmistakable in the air that Tahaa is also known as "Vanilla Island."

Another source of income for locals is the harvesting of black pearls, facilitated by the abundance of oysters in the island's bays.

Thanks to the lush coconut forest, copra production is also a very important activity for the local economy.

Transport
Taha’a and its small islets can be reached by boat and outrigger from Raiatea. The short sail drops visitors on an islet beach with a small lagoon, and in the near distance, a view of Bora Bora. These parts of the Society Islands are less modernized.

Culture 
An ancient tradition in Tahaa is "rock fishing" (tautai-taora in the local language), which was very popular, especially in the past, in the islands of Oceania. The fishermen sit in pairs in different canoes, all lined up a few dozen meters from the shore, inside the reef: in each boat, one fisherman stands at the bow and hits the surface of the sea with a large stone tied to a rope, while the other paddles towards the shore.

The fish, frightened by the noise, flee towards the shore, a few meters from where other fishermen (usually women) are waiting for them. These fishermen use their legs to prevent them from escaping and, when the fish come close, they catch them with their bare hands and load them into baskets or other canoes. Today, pebble fishing in Tahaa takes place mainly during the October festival: for the occasion, the fishing canoes are decorated with garlands of tiare, the traditional Polynesian flower.

Religion 
The majority of the population is affiliated with Christianity, a legacy of European colonization and the activity of missionary groups both from various Protestant groups and the Catholic Church. The Archdiocese of Papeete controls 2 churches on the island, the Church of Saint Clement in the town of Patio in the far north (Église de Saint-Clément) and the Church of Saint Peter Celestine in Poutoru in the far south (Église de Saint-Pierre-Célestin). There are also followers of the traditional Tahitian religion on the island.

Sports 
In terms of sports, Tahaa is, along with Bora Bora, Raiatea and Huahine, one of the four islands among which the Hawaiki Nui Va'a, an international Polynesian canoe (va'a) competition, is held.

Languages 
The official language is French, but the Tahitian language is more widely spoken in Tahiti than in Polynesia as a whole: 77% of the population speaks Tahitian in the family and more than 93% are fluent in it.

References 

Communes of French Polynesia
Islands of the Society Islands
Vanilla production